Wayne Township is one of the twenty-five townships of Muskingum County, Ohio, United States.  The 2000 census found 4,455 people in the township.

Geography
Located in the south central part of the county, it borders the following townships:
Washington Township - north
Perry Township - northeast
Salt Creek Township - east
Blue Rock Township - southeast
Harrison Township - south
Brush Creek Township - southwest
Springfield Township - west
Falls Township - northwest corner

No municipalities are located in Wayne Township, although the unincorporated community of Duncan Falls lies in the southeastern part of the township.

Name and history
Wayne Township was named for Anthony Wayne. It is one of twenty Wayne Townships statewide.

By the 1830s, Wayne Township had a church and two salt works.

Government
The township is governed by a three-member board of trustees, who are elected in November of odd-numbered years to a four-year term beginning on the following January 1. Two are elected in the year after the presidential election and one is elected in the year before it. There is also an elected township fiscal officer, who serves a four-year term beginning on April 1 of the year after the election, which is held in November of the year before the presidential election. Vacancies in the fiscal officership or on the board of trustees are filled by the remaining trustees.

References

External links
County website

Townships in Muskingum County, Ohio
Townships in Ohio